Tamulis is a surname. Notable people with the surname include:

Jonas Tamulis (born 1958), Lithuanian politician
Justas Tamulis (born 1994), Lithuanian basketball player
Kris Tamulis (born 1980), American golfer
Ričardas Tamulis (1938–2008), Lithuanian boxer
Vito Tamulis (1911–1974), American baseball player